Gays With Kids  is a digital media resource and social network space dedicated exclusively to helping gay, bi and trans (GBT) men become dads and navigate fatherhood.

History 
Gays With Kids was founded in 2014 with the goal of inspiring, informing and guiding gay, bi and trans men throughout their journey of family building, and  supporting them to live their best authentic lives as they explore fatherhood.

The GWK platform was founded by Brian Rosenberg and his husband Ferd van Gameren. The gay couple became first-time dads in 2009 by creating their family through adoption and surrogacy.

See also 
 LGBT parenting
 LGBT community
 Surrogacy
 Adoption

References

External links
 Official website

Gay men's websites